Listed are student publications in Australia. Most are published by student unions.

National 
 Previously National U, U, Axis, National Student, Student In Australia, The Student Leader and Student View

Australian Capital Territory
 Curieux, University of Canberra and previously CUrio
 Woroni, ANU Observer, Demos Journal and The Monsoon Project, Australian National University

New South Wales

 Grapeshot, Macquarie University and previously Arena, Muscateer and The Word
 Honi Soit, University of Sydney and previously BULL
 Hungappa (Wagga Wagga campus) and Interp (Bathurst campus), Charles Sturt University and previously Interpellator (Bathurst campus)
 Neucleus, University of New England
 Opus and Yak, University of Newcastle
 FLUNK, Southern Cross University and previously Pulp SCUM and Properganda
 Tertangala, University of Wollongong
 Tharunka, Blitz, Arcadia (COFA campus) and Framework (COFA campus), University of New South Wales and previously Zing Tycoon (COFA campus)
 Vertigo and Playground, University of Technology, Sydney
W'SUP, Western Sydney University and previously HAC, TWOT, Nepean Echo, 1st Edition, Jumbunna, Berzerk, Hemlock, The Western Onion, Degreeº and Cruwsible

Northern Territory
 Flycatcher, Charles Darwin University and previously Delirra and The Beard

Queensland
Bound, Bond University and previously Scope and Bond Briefs
Getamungstit (Gold Coast campus), Griffith University and previously Gravity (Nathan campus) and Arbiter (Nathan campus)
Scoop, University of the Sunshine Coast and previously ISM
Semper Floreat, University of Queensland
The Ashes, University of Southern Queensland and previously The Rambler
The Bullsheet, James Cook University and previously Bedlam and The Hack
Universe Magazine, Queensland University of Technology and previously CirQUTry, Utopia and Definite Article
 Previously The Rattler and Pipeline, Central Queensland University

South Australia
 Empire Times, Flinders University and previously Libertine
 On Dit, University of Adelaide
 Verse, University of South Australia and previously Entropy and UniLifeMag
 On The Record'', University of South Australia student news publication.

Tasmania
 Togatus, University of Tasmania

VictoriaCatalyst and The Swanston Gazette, RMIT University, and previously Don't Panic (Bundoora campus), Flip (Phillip Institute of Technology) and Plexus (Preston Institute of Technology)Evolve, Royal Gurkhas Institute of Technology Australia
 Farrago, University of Melbourne and previously Postgraduate Review, Spark (VCA campus), Griffin and Farrago-Griffin Fedpress, Federation University and previously Bootleg, Hotch Potch, Oxalian (Gippsland campus), Emit (Gippsland campus), Winston (Gippsland campus) and Ink (Berwick campus)Hyde, Victoria University of Technology and previously Genesis, NoName and SeedLot's Wife (Clayton campus) and Esperanto (Caulfield campus), Monash University and previously Chaos, Naked Wasp and Otico (Caulfield and Peninsula campus)
 Rabelais Student Media, La Trobe University and previously Missing Link and 3rd Degree (Bendigo campus)
 Swine, Swinburne University of Technology and previously Tabula RasaWordly, Deakin University and previously Spurious Logic (Rusden campus) and CrossfirePreviously The Worm, intercampus

Western AustraliaDircksey, Edith Cowan University and previously Harambee, G-Spot and GSMGrok, Curtin University of Technology
 Metior, Murdoch UniversityOnyx, Blackstone Society, UWA
 Pelican, University of Western AustraliaPerth International Law Journal, UWA International Law ClubWestern Australian Student Law ReviewPreviously Quasimodo, University of Notre Dame

High schoolLion's Roar, Wesley College (St Kilda Road campus)Parallel, Nossal High School
 Purple Haze, Wesley College (Glen Waverley campus)
 Sentinel, Melbourne High School
 Tiger'', Sydney Grammar School

See also
 Student publication
 List of student newspapers
List of student newspapers in Canada
List of student newspapers in the United Kingdom
List of student newspapers in the United States of America

References

 
Student